Alison P. Galvani (born ca. 1977) is an American epidemiologist. She is the Burnett and Stender Families Professor of Epidemiology at the Yale School of Public Health and the Director of the Center for Infectious Disease Modeling and Analysis.

She became interested in biology after reading Richard Dawkins' The Blind Watchmaker in high school. She wrote Dawkins and he replied, encouraging her to apply to Oxford University. She earned a degree in biological sciences from Oxford and continued her studies there, receiving a PhD in theoretical epidemiology.

The focus of Galvani's research is the application of evolutionary ecology and epidemiology in the study of diseases. She has published over 160 scholarly articles. Galvani directs the Center for Infectious Disease Modeling and Analysis (CIDMA) since 2013. In 2014 she and her team published a series of papers covering the ongoing Ebola virus epidemic in West Africa. She was named the Burnett and Stender Families Professor of Public Health in 2015. She is the youngest faculty member in Yale School of Medicine's history to be appointed to a named professorship.  Anthony Fauci, director of the US National Institute of Allergy and Infectious Diseases, described Dr. Galvani as an international star in the field of modelling of infectious diseases and commented on her research contributions as “She has made major contributions in our understanding of the dynamics and impact of a variety of infectious diseases outbreaks including HIV/AIDS, Zika, Ebola, and influenza, among many others and now most recently COVID-19. It has been a pleasure to have her as an esteemed colleague and friend.”

Awards and honors
2005 – Young Investigator Prize (American Society of Naturalists)
2006 – John Simon Guggenheim Memorial Foundation Award
2007 – MacMillan Award
2007 – Institute for Advanced Studies in Berlin fellowship
2012 – Blavatnik Awards for Young Scientists
2013 – Bellman Prize

References

1970s births
Living people
American women epidemiologists
American epidemiologists
Yale University faculty
Alumni of the University of Oxford
American women academics
21st-century American women